Awuah is an Akan surname. Notable people with the surname include:

 Emmanuel Awuah Baffour (born 1989), Ghanaian footballer
 Esi Awuah, Ghanaian academician 
 Ignatius Baffour-Awuah (born 1966), Ghanaian politician
 Jones Awuah (born 1983), Ghanaian footballer
 Joseph Awuah-Darko (born 1996), British social entrepreneur, artist and philanthropist
 Kwame Awuah (born 1995), Canadian soccer player
 Patrick Awuah Jr. (born 1965), Ghanaian educator
 Kristal Awuah British Athlete
 Hiswill Awuah(* 14. August 2000 in Hamburg) American-Football player